The bicolored swamp snake also known as the striped swamp snake (Limnophis bicolor) is a species of African venomous snake. It is the type species of the genus Limnophis.  Their backs are black with a white underbelly.

Distribution
This species is found:
 in the southwest of Angola;
 in northern Botswana;
 in eastern and southern Democratic Republic of Congo;
 in southern Zambia, in the basins of the Okavango and Zambezi;
 in Zimbabwe.

Subspecies
The variety or subspecies Limnophis bicolor  bangweolicus (Mertens, 1936) has been elevated to full species rank as Limnophis bangweolicus.

References

Limnophis
Reptiles described in 1865
Taxa named by Albert Günther
Reptiles of Angola
Reptiles of Botswana
Reptiles of Zambia
Reptiles of Zimbabwe
Reptiles of the Democratic Republic of the Congo